Abiodun (Abi) Orinayo Koya (born 22 December 1980) is a Nigerian-born classical and operatic singer based in the United States.

Biography
Born to a musical family in Ijebu-Ode, in Nigeria's Ogun State, the last of five children, Koya's father introduced classical music to his youngest daughter at the age of three. Within a few years, Koya began playing the violin and singing. Koya left Nigeria in 2001 for the United States, where she studied Business Management at the University of the District of Columbia. She went on to pursue a graduate degree in music at Catholic University, in Washington D.C.

Koya is fluent and literate in Yoruba.

One of very few professionally trained opera singers of African origin, Koya is called the Presidents' and Kings' singer: having performed for Presidents and Vice Presidents of the United States, Nigeria, Senegal, Ghana, Liberia, and Côte d'Ivoire, and at such places as the White House, the US Presidential inauguration, and the Democratic National Convention.

In 2021, Koya authored a book of 30 of her poems, titled, "The Moods of a Goddess."

Koya was the only African and opera singer to be featured on BET's gospel series, Bobby Jones Gospel.

Koya's non-profit, The Abiodun Koya Foundation, engages in mentorship activities for at-risk children in Nigeria and the US through her Music Literacy Program Initiative. Her charity organization also provides scholarships to young girls in many sub-Saharan African countries and supports incarcerated women throughout Nigeria.

References

External links 
Abiodun Koya's website

1980 births
21st-century Nigerian women singers
Nigerian sopranos
Nigerian gospel singers
Living people
Yoruba musicians
Nigerian emigrants to the United States
Catholic University of America alumni
University of the District of Columbia alumni
People from Ogun State
Yoruba philanthropists
21st-century Nigerian actresses
Nigerian humanitarians
Nigerian women writers
Nigerian women poets
Yoruba people
Nigerian philanthropists
Nigerian film actresses